The 8th IAAF World Indoor Championships in Athletics were held at the Pavilhão Atlântico in Lisbon, Portugal from March 9 to March 11, 2001. It was the first time the Championships had been held in Portugal. There were a total number of 511 participating athletes from 136 countries.

Results

Men
1997 | 1999 | 2001 | 2003 | 2004

Women
1997 | 1999 | 2001 | 2003 | 2004

Medals table

Participating nations

  (1)
  (3)
  (1)
  (1)
  (1)
  (1)
  (1)
  (8)
  (5)
  (1)
  (4)
  (1)
  (1)
  (8)
  (7)
  (1)
  (1)
  (4)
  (6)
  (1)
  (1)
  (9)
  (1)
  (1)
  (1)
  (1)
  (1)
  (12)
  (1)
  (1)
  (1)
  (3)
  (10)
  (2)
  (8)
  (1)
  (1)
  (1)
  (1)
  (1)
  (1)
  (4)
  (14)
  (1)
  (1)
  (1)
  (16)
  (1)
  (17)
  (10)
  (1)
  (1)
  (3)
  (1)
  (1)
  (4)
  (1)
  (5)
  (4)
  (12)
  (15)
  (4)
  (4)
  (6)
  (1)
  (4)
  (1)
  (3)
  (1)
  (1)
  (1)
  (1)
  (1)
  (1)
  (1)
  (1)
  (1)
  (1)
  (1)
  (2)
  (7)
  (2)
  (1)
  (3)
  (1)
  (1)
  (8)
  (1)
  (1)
  (1)
  (1)
  (1)
  (1)
  (1)
  (1)
  (9)
  (17)
  (1)
  (1)
  (11)
  (46)
  (1)
  (1)
  (2)
  (1)
  (1)
  (1)
  (1)
  (1)
  (1)
  (7)
  (1)
  (4)
  (1)
  (18)
  (4)
  (1)
  (1)
  (6)
  (3)
  (1)
  (1)
  (1)
  (1)
  (1)
  (2)
  (4)
  (2)
  (1)
  (14)
  (45)
  (1)
  (2)
  (1)
  (1)
  (1)

See also
 2001 in athletics (track and field)

References
 2001 IAAF World Indoor Championships in Athletics Official Website
 Athletics Australia

 
World Athletics Indoor Championships
World Indoor Championships
IAAF World Indoor Championships
Sports competitions in Lisbon
International athletics competitions hosted by Portugal
2000s in Lisbon
March 2001 sports events in Europe